Andrey Dmitrievich Shabasov (born 20 June 1994) is a Russian swimmer. He competed at the 2016 Summer Olympics in the men's 200 metre backstroke event; his time of 1:56.84 in the semifinals did not qualify him for the final.

References

1994 births
Living people
Russian male swimmers
Olympic swimmers of Russia
Swimmers at the 2016 Summer Olympics
Medalists at the FINA World Swimming Championships (25 m)
Universiade medalists in swimming
Universiade gold medalists for Russia
Medalists at the 2015 Summer Universiade
Medalists at the 2017 Summer Universiade